Agritubel Pro Cycling Team was a French professional road race cycling team. The team's title sponsor, Agritubel, is a manufacturer and supplier of tubular metal products for cattle, livestock and farming.

Agritubel mostly competed for wins at the UCI Europe Tour; however, the team was selected as one of two wildcard teams (that is, teams not on the UCI ProTour) to compete at the 2006, 2007, 2008, and 2009 Tour de France. In 2006, Agritubel riders had competed at several other UCI ProTour events, including Paris–Nice, Paris–Roubaix, La Flèche Wallonne, Liège–Bastogne–Liège, and Critérium du Dauphiné Libéré

2009 Team roster
As of July 26, 2009.

Major wins 

2005
 Trophée Luc Leblanc, Florent Brard
 Paris–Troyes, Florent Brard
 Classic Loire Atlantique, José Alberto Martínez
 La Roue Tourangelle, Gilles Canouet
 Stage 2b Circuit de la Sarthe, Florent Brard
 Stage 4 Circuit de Lorraine, Saulius Ruskys
 Tour du Poitou Charentes, Christophe Agnolutto
 Tour du Poitou Charentes, Linas Balčiūnas
2006
 Stage 3 Critérium International, José Alberto Martínez
 Stage 3 Rhône-Alpes Isère Tour, Eduardo Gonzalo
 Stage 3 Circuit de Lorraine, Eduardo Gonzalo
 Overall Bayern Rundfahrt, José Alberto Martínez
 Stage 1 Boucles de la Mayenne, Benoît Sinner
 Stage 10 Tour de France, Juan Miguel Mercado
 Overall Tour de l'Avenir, Moises Dueñas
Stage 3, Hans Dekkers
Stage 6, Moises Dueñas
2007
 Stage 2 Driedaagse van West-Vlaanderen, Hans Dekkers
 Classic Loire Atlantique, Nicolas Jalabert
 Stage 2 Rhône-Alpes Isère Tour, Nicolas Vogondy
 Tour de Vendée, Mikel Gaztañaga
 Stage 1 GP Paredes Rota dos Móveis, Mikel Gaztañaga
 Boucles de l'Aulne, Romain Feillu
 Stage 3 Tour de Luxembourg, Romain Feillu
 Overall Boucles de la Mayenne, Nicolas Vogondy
Stage 2, Nicolas Vogondy
 Overall Regio Tour, Moises Dueñas
Stage 2, Moises Dueñas
 Overall Tour of Britain, Romain Feillu
 Paris–Bourges, Romain Feillu
2008
 Stage 2 Tour Méditerranéen, Jimmy Casper
 Overall Les 3 Jours de Vaucluse, Nicolas Vogondy
Stage 1, Nicolas Vogondy
 Classic Loire Atlantique, Mikel Gaztañaga
 Stage 1 Tour de Normandie, Maxime Bouet
 Stage 2, 3 & 4 Tour de Normandie, Anthony Ravard
 Stage 6 Tour de Normandie, Steven Caethoven
 Route Adélie de Vitré, Kevyn Ista
 Stage 1 Circuit de la Sarthe, Anthony Ravard
 Stage 3 Rhône-Alpes Isère Tour, Nicolas Vogondy
 Stage 2 Circuit de Lorraine, Jimmy Casper
 Boucles de l'Aulne, Romain Feillu
 Overall Boucles de la Mayenne, Freddy Bichot
Prologue, Nicolas Vogondy
Stage 2, Jimmy Casper
  Road Race Championship, Nicolas Vogondy
 Stage 5 Tour Alsace, Brice Feillu
 Châteauroux Classic, Anthony Ravard
 Overall Tour of Britain, Geoffroy Lequatre
Stage 3, Emilien Benoit Berges
 Yellow jersey as leader of the general classification after stage 4, Tour de France, Romain Feillu
2009
 Stage 3 Tour Méditerranéen, Kevyn Ista
 Boucles du Sud Ardèche, Freddy Bichot
 Overall Les 3 Jours de Vaucluse, David Lelay
Stage 1, Maxime Bouet
 Stage 2 Tour de Normandie, Steven Caethoven
 Stage 5 Tour de Normandie, Freddy Bichot
 Overall Volta ao Alentejo, Maxime Bouet
Stage 1, Maxime Bouet
 Overall Circuit de la Sarthe, David Lelay
Stage 2, David Lelay
 Overall Rhône-Alpes Isère Tour, Yann Huguet
Stage 1, Nicolas Vogondy
Stage 2, Yann Huguet
Stage 3, Christophe Laurent
 Stage 2 Tour de Picardie, Romain Feillu
 Boucles de l'Aulne, Maxime Bouet
 Tour du Doubs, Yann Huguet
 Stage 7 Tour de France, Brice Feillu
 Stage 1 Tour de Wallonie, Freddy Bichot
 Stage 1 Paris–Corrèze, Freddy Bichot
 Stage 4 Tour du Limousin, Romain Feillu
 Stage 1 Tour du Poitou Charentes, Anthony Ravard
 Grand Prix de Fourmies, Romain Feillu

See also
List of teams and cyclists in the 2008 Tour de France
2008 Tour de France
Tour de France

References

External links 
 

Defunct cycling teams based in France
Cycling teams established in 2004
Cycling teams disestablished in 2009